Harry Walter "Buck" Ewing (July 18, 1888 – March 11, 1962) was an American football player, coach of football, basketball and baseball, and college athletics administrator. He was a 1909 graduate of University of Nebraska where he played football. Ewing served as the head football coach at Morningside College (1911), South Dakota State College (1912–1917), Ohio Wesleyan University (1919–1921), Miami University (1922–1923), and Otterbein College (1935–1938, 1942–1945, 1951–1954), compiling a career college football record of 82–82–10. He was also the head basketball coach at South Dakota State (1912–1913, 1914–1917), Ohio Wesleyan (1919–1920), Miami (1922–1924), and Otterbein (1942–1952), tallying a career college basketball mark of 117–111–1.

Early life
A native of Lincoln, Nebraska, Ewing attended Lincoln High School where he graduated in 1906. He was an all around athlete participating in football, basketball, track, and baseball. In football, he played both tackle and fullback. His football team claimed the high school championship of the United States in 1905. In track, he broke three Lincoln High School records for discus (111 feet) and 12 lb shot put (48 feet 5 inches) and the 12 lb hammer throw (165 feet 8 inches).

Playing career
After playing tackle on the freshman team, Ewing lettered in football at the University of Nebraska under coach William C. "King" Cole in 1907, 1908, and 1909.   Weighing 188-pounds, he played guard and was known as a "natural people mover on the field."  Ewing helped the 1907 Nebraska Cornhuskers to an 8–2 record and a share of the Missouri Valley Conference title. In 1908, the Cornhuskers finished with 7–2–1 with Ewing starting every game at left guard.  In his last season as a Cornhusker the team's record slipped to a 3–3–2 mark.

Coaching career
After finishing his playing days at Nebraska, Ewing joined the Cornhuskers coaching staff.  In 1911, he was named Director of Athletics and coach at Morningside College in Sioux City, Iowa. The following year, he took a coaching position in both football and basketball at South Dakota State College. In 1914, he added the title of athletic director.  Ewing served as football coach at South Dakota from 1912 through 1917 with a record of 26–12–2.   He also served as basketball coach for the 1912–13 season where his team went 0–2. The next season the college did not field a team but Ewing returned to coach the basketball team for the 1914–15, 1915–16, and 1916–17 seasons. He finished his career as South Dakota State's basketball coach with a record of 14–20–1.

In 1918 Ewing was named head coach of Ohio Wesleyan University where he eventually was promoted to Associate Professor of Physical Education and Graduate Manager.   In his three years as football coach at Ohio Wesleyan he had a combined record of 11–9.   He also served as basketball coach for the 1919–20 season where his team went 5–8.  In 1922, he took a position as Professor of Physical Education and Director of Intercollegiate Athletics at Miami University. While at Miami he served as head coach of both the football and basketball teams.   In the two years as head coach had a combined record of 11–15 in basketball and 7–7–2 in football.

Ewing returned to college coaching in 1934 when he took a position at Otterbein College in Westerville, Ohio. Known as "Mr. Athletics" at Otterbein he served as coach of numerous sports as well as athletic director, trainer, and Physical Education Director from 1934 to 1958. During his career as a coach at Otterbein, Ewing compiled a 32–51–6 record in football and an 87–68 record in basketball. He was honored several ways by Otterbein for his impact on athletics. The track in the Rike Center is named in his memory and he was named to the Otterbein College Athletic Hall of Fame in 2009.

Head coaching record

Football

References

External links
 

1888 births
1962 deaths
American football guards
Miami RedHawks athletic directors
Miami RedHawks football coaches
Miami RedHawks men's basketball coaches
Morningside Mustangs athletic directors
Morningside Mustangs football coaches
Nebraska Cornhuskers football coaches
Nebraska Cornhuskers football players
Ohio Wesleyan Battling Bishops football coaches
Ohio Wesleyan Battling Bishops men's basketball coaches
Otterbein Cardinals athletic directors
Otterbein Cardinals football coaches
Otterbein Cardinals men's basketball coaches
South Dakota State Jackrabbits athletic directors
South Dakota State Jackrabbits baseball coaches
South Dakota State Jackrabbits football coaches
South Dakota State Jackrabbits men's basketball coaches
Sportspeople from Lincoln, Nebraska
Coaches of American football from Nebraska
Players of American football from Nebraska
Baseball coaches from Nebraska
Basketball coaches from Nebraska